Pera aperta is a species of plant in the family Euphorbiaceae. It is endemic to Panama.

References

Peraceae
Endemic flora of Panama
Data deficient plants
Taxonomy articles created by Polbot
Taxa named by Léon Croizat